John William McEwen (25 November 1862 – 16 February 1902) was an English first-class cricketer active 19yy–yy who played for Middlesex. He was born in Dalston; died in Stepney.

References

1862 births
1902 deaths
English cricketers
Middlesex cricketers

People from Dalston